Jaroslav "Yogi" Svejkovský (born October 1, 1976) is a Czech former professional ice hockey left wing. He was drafted in the first round, 17th overall, by the Washington Capitals in the 1996 NHL Entry Draft.

Career
Drafted from the Western Hockey League's Tri-City Americans, Svejkovský made his professional debut with the Portland Pirates of the American Hockey League in the 1996–97 season. He made his NHL debut during the same season with the Capitals, appearing in 19 games and scoring seven goals. In the Capitals' last game of the 1996–97 season, Svejkovský scored four goals, as Washington beat the Buffalo Sabres 8–3. , he is the only Capitals rookie to score four goals in one game.

Svejkovský played parts of three more seasons with the Capitals, he was then traded to the Tampa Bay Lightning during the 1999–2000 season. Svejkovský finished the season with the Lightning, then spent the 2000–01 season in the International Hockey League with the Detroit Vipers. He sustained a concussion during his second game for the Vipers, subsequently retiring from the sport without taking part in any more games. In a 2002 USA Today story, Tampa Bay Lightning general manager Jay Feaster said that Svejkovský was out of hockey due to post-concussion syndrome. In his NHL career, Svejkovský appeared in 113 games, scoring 23 goals and adding 19 assists.

Personal life

Currently, Svejkovský is a skills coach with the Vancouver Giants of the Western Hockey League. He is also Director of Hockey Operations with the Seafair Minor Hockey Association, and Program Director of the BC Bears AAA spring hockey association.

Career statistics

Regular season and playoffs

Awards
 WHL West Second All-Star Team – 1995-96 season
 Dudley "Red" Garrett Memorial Award (most outstanding rookie in AHL): 1996–97 season

References

External links
 

1976 births
Living people
Czech ice hockey left wingers
Detroit Vipers players
HC Plzeň players
HC Tábor players
National Hockey League first-round draft picks
Sportspeople from Plzeň
Portland Pirates players
Tampa Bay Lightning players
Tri-City Americans players
Washington Capitals draft picks
Washington Capitals players
Czech ice hockey coaches
Czech expatriate ice hockey players in the United States
Czech expatriate sportspeople in Canada